Battle of the Sexes is a 1920 German silent film directed by Joseph Delmont and starring Paul Hartmann, Eduard von Winterstein and Eva Everth.

Cast

References

Bibliography

External links

1920 films
Films of the Weimar Republic
German silent feature films
Films directed by Joseph Delmont
German black-and-white films
1920s German films